Jane Maas (March 14, 1932 – November 16, 2018) was an American advertising executive and author.

Career
Maas started her career as a junior copy editor at Ogilvy & Mathers in 1964 and rose to creative director and eventually became the second female VP of the agency. In 1976, Maas joined agency Wells Rich Greene as senior VP and creative director.

At WRG, Maas has been credited with shepherding the I Love New York tourism campaign for the New York Department of Commerce. Considered a trailblazer in the world of advertising, Maas commenced her career during an era in which few women worked in creative or executive positions and is frequently referenced as one of the founding mothers of advertising.

Books
 Better Brochures, Catalogs and Mailing Pieces: A Practical Guide with 178 Rules for More Effective Sales Pieces that Cost Less (July 15, 1984), Macmillan, 
 Adventures of an Advertising Woman (March 12, 1987), Random House, 
 How to Advertise (2005), Macmillan, with Kenneth Roman and Martin Nisenholtz
 Mad Women: The Other Side of Life on Madison Avenue in the '60s and Beyond (February 28, 2012), Macmillan, 
 The Christmas Angel: A Novel (November 19, 2013), Macmillan,

References

American advertising executives
Women in advertising
1932 births
2018 deaths
People from Jersey City, New Jersey